The yellow-throated woodland warbler (Phylloscopus ruficapilla) is a species of Old World warbler in the family Phylloscopidae. It is found in Eswatini, Kenya, Malawi, Mozambique, South Africa, Tanzania, Zambia, and Zimbabwe. Its natural habitats are subtropical or tropical dry forest and subtropical or tropical moist lowland forest.

References

External links
 Yellow-throated woodland warbler - Species text in The Atlas of Southern African Birds.

yellow-throated woodland warbler
Birds of East Africa
Birds of Southern Africa
yellow-throated woodland warbler
Taxonomy articles created by Polbot